John F. Buckley (February 10, 1892 – November 17, 1965) was an American lawyer and politician.

Born in Waukesha, Wisconsin, Buckley went to Carroll University and then received his law degree from University of Wisconsin Law School. Buckley then practiced law in Waukesha, Wisconsin. In 1917 and 1919, Buckley served in the Wisconsin State Assembly and was a Republican.

Notes

1892 births
1965 deaths
Politicians from Waukesha, Wisconsin
Carroll University alumni
University of Wisconsin Law School alumni
Wisconsin lawyers
Republican Party members of the Wisconsin State Assembly
20th-century American politicians
20th-century American lawyers